Soumen Chakrabarti (সৌমেন চক্রবর্তী) is an Indian computer scientist and professor in the Department of Computer Science and Engineering at IIT Bombay. He is known for his work on

 The CLEVER Web page ranking system based on hyperlinks, related to PageRank.
 Focused crawlers, which are Web crawlers guided by page topic classifiers.
 Keyword search on graph databases, later popularized by Facebook graph search.
 Named entity disambiguation in Web text.

He is author of an early book on Web search and mining.

He was awarded the Shanti Swarup Bhatnagar Prize in 2014.

He is a fellow of the Indian National Academy of Engineering, the Indian Academy of Sciences, and the Indian National Science Academy.

He is among the distinguished alumni of IIT Kharagpur.

References

External links 
 Soumen Chakrabarti's Home Page

1969 births
Living people
Engineers from Maharashtra
Place of birth missing (living people)
Recipients of the Shanti Swarup Bhatnagar Award in Engineering Science
Engineers from West Bengal